St. Francis Wood is a residential neighborhood located in southwestern San Francisco, California, south of the West Portal neighborhood and west of Mount Davidson.
St. Francis Wood had a population of 1,229 and a median household income of $179,244 in 2019.
Characterized by family homes on spacious lots (by San Francisco standards), St. Francis Wood has no visible businesses and has a correspondingly low profile compared to similar wealthy neighborhoods such as the Marina District and Pacific Heights.  St. Francis Wood is one of eight master-planned residence parks in San Francisco.

History 
St. Francis Wood was established in 1912 as a neighborhood for upper-middle class residents with convenient streetcar access to jobs downtown. The residence park was inspired by the City Beautiful movement. The neighborhood's street layout was designed by the Olmsted Brothers and characterized by "standalone houses, curvilinear streets, extensive landscaping and decorative monuments" that evoked the feeling of living in a park. Like other residence parks, the neighborhood used racial covenants to block Black and Asian people from moving in. The neighborhood was an early adopter of zoning restrictions, including single-family zoning to ban apartment buildings and commercial development, because they were thought to attract racial minorities.

Historic Designation 
On June 30, 2022, St. Francis Wood was added to the National Register of Historic Places after a yearslong campaign by residents who quoted its architectural history as a residence park. The historic designation will require all construction projects in the neighborhood to undertake a review under the California Environmental Quality Act, adding about $10,000 in fees and 4 months in project approvals. The historic designation will also require new projects to be compatible with the neighborhood's historic character, which is typically two-story single family homes with large yards.

The designation was criticized by YIMBY activists who said that the historic designation would make it much harder for people to add housing to the neighborhood, and cement the neighborhood's status as a wealthy neighborhood that excludes Black and Latino people. Places with historic resources are often exempted from state bills that encourage the construction of new homes. State Senator Scott Wiener expressed concern that St. Francis Wood's historic designation creates a model for other wealthy neighborhoods to evade the intent of state housing law to build more homes in all neighborhoods.

The St. Francis Homes Association said that the historic designation was about the architectural history and said that they were an inclusive community open to the public. St. Francis Wood's amenities are not open to the public.

Demographics 

In the two 2020 census tracts that contain St. Francis Wood 2020 census, at least 80% of the residents are White or Asian. The median household income is $188,400.

References

External links

A short history of St. Francis Wood
Traffic solution for St. Francis Circle

Neighborhoods in San Francisco
Streetcar suburbs